Giacomo Alberelli or Albarelli was an Italian painter, active mainly in Venice in the years 1600–1650.

Life
Alberelli was a pupil and assistant of  Jacopo Palma the Younger with whom he worked for 34 years. He painted historical subjects, including the Baptism of Christ for the church of the Ognissanti in Venice. According to Ridolfi, he was also a sculptor.

References

1650s deaths
17th-century Italian painters
Italian male painters
Italian Baroque painters
Painters from Venice
Year of birth unknown